Bitnoon (Rock Salt) is a Bengali romantic comedy film directed by Abhijit Guha, Sudeshna Roy and produced by Brij Jalan. This film was released in 2015.

Plot
Rahul is a corporate employee married with Moushumi. They live happily with their six-year-old son, who believe that they cannot be trusted alone. The couple hardly have any time of their own and continue a dull relationship. Once Rahul become sexually frustrated and meet to dancer Rusha. He make romantic relationship with her which results funny consequences.

Cast
 Ritwick Chakraborty as Rahul
 Sayani Ghosh as Rusha
 Gargi Roychowdhury as Mousumi

References

Indian romantic comedy films
Films set in Kolkata
2015 films
Bengali-language Indian films
2010s Bengali-language films
Films directed by Abhijit Guha and Sudeshna Roy

External links